Gëzim is an Albanian masculine given name. It is derived from the Albanian word gëzim, meaning "joy." 

People with the name Gëzim include: 

Gëzim Alpion (b. 1962), Albanian sociologist, philosopher and educator
Gëzim Boçari (b. ????), Albanian politician, physician and writer
Gëzim Dibra (1956 – 2011), Albanian politician
Gëzim Erebara (1929 – 2007),  Albanian film director, screen player, translator and cinematography
Gëzim Gashi (b. 1990), Kosovar-Swedish singer 
Gëzim Hajdinaga (b. 1964), Montenegrin-Albanian politician, former member of Democratic Union of Albanians
Gëzim Kasmi (b. 1942), Albanian footballer
Gëzim Krasniqi (b. 1990), Kosovar footballer
Gëzim Tafa (b. ????), Albanian publisher

References

Albanian masculine given names